Lago di Burano is a lake at Capalbio in the Province of Grosseto, Tuscany, Italy. Its surface area is 2.36 km². It lies next to the village of Capalbio Scalo, where the train station is situated.

References

Lakes of Tuscany
Ramsar sites in Italy